A Bag of Gold is a live album by pianist Les McCann recorded in 1960-64 and released on the Pacific Jazz label.

Reception

Allmusic gives the album 3 stars.

Track listing 
All compositions by Les McCann
 "The Shampoo" - 8:41
 "(Shades of) Spanish Onions" - 2:55
 "The Shout" - 5:35
 "Gone On and Get That Church" - 3:40
 "Fish This Week" - 2:40
 "Kathleen's Theme" - 3:31
 "The Truth" - 6:45
 "We'll See Yaw'll After While Ya Heah" - 3:48

Personnel 
Les McCann - piano
Paul Chambers (tracks 5 & 6), Victor Gaskin (tracks 1-3), Herbie Lewis (tracks 4, 7 & 8) - bass
Paul Humphrey (tracks 1-3, 5 & 6), Ron Jefferson (tracks 4, 7 & 8) - drums

References 

Les McCann live albums
1966 live albums
Pacific Jazz Records live albums